Soch Kral (1782  29 November 1854), was a Kashmiri Sufi poet, and is a Sufi saint.

Soch Kral was born in 1782 in the village of Inder, in the Pulwama district of Jammu and Kashmir. He was a potter by profession. He lived a simple life devoted to spirituality, monotheism and mysticism. His father was the Sufi poet Arif Kral, and he was a disciple of Kashmiri poet Momin Sahab R.A.

Soch Kral may have migrated to the village of Devsar in the Anantnag district, where his descendants are still living. He married but divorced his wife, and died on 29 November 1854 in Inder.

Legacy 
According to a blogger on Blogspot.com, Soch Kral used poetry as a tool to enlighten the minds of people, and his work promoted Sufism in Kashmiri poetry.

The Soch Kral Memorial College of Education in Pulwama was named after him.

In about 2009 the state government set aside Rs 50 lakh for the development of a heritage site near the Soch Kral's shrine. By 2012 construction had not started.

In 2016, at Pulwama Degree College, singer Dhananjay Kaul grouped Lal-Ded, Mahjoor, Wahab Khar, and Soch Kral as among the "Sufi greats that Pulwama has produced", and sung their poetry which he set to music.

References

1782 births
1854 deaths
Kashmiri poets
Sufi poets
People from Pulwama district
kashmiri Sufi saints
Sufi teachers